Mari Jászai (born Mária Krippel; 24 February 1850, Ászár – 5 October 1926, Budapest) was a Hungarian actress.

Life
Mari Jászai 24 February 1850 in Ászár, Komárom county, as a daughter of a carpenter. She worked from age 10 as a maidservant, both in Budapest and Vienna, assisting soldiers as a sutling wench in the Battle of Königgrätz. In 1866, aged 16, she fled to the touring company of Gusztáv Hubay in Székesfehérvár, and began to work as an extra. By 1867 she already acted on stages of Buda, and from 1868, in the theatre of Cluj-Napoca. She met her first husband, comedian Vidor Kassai during her time in Buda, whom she divorced two years later, never marrying again. Jászai became a member of the National Theatre in 1872, where she remained until her death (except for the 1900 season, working in Vígszínház theatre).

Legacy
A permanent member of the National Theatre since 1901, Mari Jászai became one of the most influential actors in the Hungarian theatrical world. Playing over 300 roles, she also translated a number of works, including Henrik Ibsen's John Gabriel Borkman. The theatre of Tatabánya is named after her, as are numerous public places in Budapest, and one of the premier awards of national dramatic artists, the Jászai Mari Award.

Selected filmography
 Bánk Bán (1914)
 The Exile (1914)

Sources
István, Lehel. Jászai Mari emlékiratai. Budapest: Babits Kiadó, 2003. 
Mónika, Balatoni. Tükör-játék. Budapest: Kairosz Kiadó, 2002.

External links
Official site of the Jászai Mari Theatre
Mari Jászai on Port.hu

1850 births
1926 deaths
Hungarian stage actresses
Burials at Kerepesi Cemetery
19th-century Hungarian actresses
Hungarian silent film actresses
20th-century Hungarian actresses